The Horner site, also known as the Creek site and Horner's Corner site, and designated by the Smithsonian trinomial 48PA29, is an important archaeological site near Cody, Wyoming.  It is the type site for the Cody complex.  It was declared a National Historic Landmark in 1961.

Setting
The Horner site is located in the foothills of the Absaroka Range, on a terrace of land overlooking the confluence of Sage Creek and the Shoshone River, east of the town of Cody.  The terrace is relatively flat, and has historically seen some cultivation.  The area of archaeological interest has not been cultivated since its discovery.  The site is on the western edge of the Bighorn Basin, an area believed to have a substantial prehistoric buffalo population.

Archaeological history
The site was discovered in 1939 by a local collector, on land then belonging to Pearl Horner.  In 1948, he notified Glen Jepsen, an archaeologist at Princeton University, of his finds.  Jepsen, who had been performing investigations elsewhere in the Bighorn Basin, organized the first excavations on the site, in August 1949.  Over the next three years, a number of excavations took place at the site, garnering national press interest, and visits by a great many scientists studying the early history of man in North America.  The site became important because it was the first place where both Eden and Scottsbluff projectile points were found in properly datable geological contexts, and it is this confluence that gave rise to the Cody complex

Due to the large amount of publicity, the site suffered in the following years from illegal artifact collection, compromising it to some extent.  Archaeologist George Frisson, writing in 1987, opined that the site continued to be important due to its unique setting. Some deeply buried artifacts not readily discoverable by amateurs are known to remain at the site.

See also
List of National Historic Landmarks in Wyoming
National Register of Historic Places listings in Park County, Wyoming

References

Bibliography

 Gibbon, Guy E.; Ames, Kenneth M. Archaeology of Prehistoric Native America: An Encyclopedia.  1998. .

External links
Horner Site at the Wyoming State Historic Preservation Office

National Historic Landmarks in Wyoming
Archaeological sites on the National Register of Historic Places in Wyoming
Geography of Park County, Wyoming
National Register of Historic Places in Park County, Wyoming
Archaeological type sites